The Indiana Register of Historic Sites and Structures was created in 1981 by the Indiana General Assembly.  The Survey and Registration Section of the Indiana Division of Historic Preservation and Archaeology oversees this state register. All places within Indiana that are listed on the National Register of Historic Places are automatically on Indiana's Register. Additional sites are on the state register, as the state's register does not require as many documents and sources for inclusion.

State register
The following is a list of historic sites on the Indiana register, but not the national register.
For a list of historic sites on both the national register and the state register, see National Register of Historic Places listings in Indiana.

See also
National Register of Historic Places listings in Indiana
List of National Historic Landmarks in Indiana
List of State Historic Sites in Indiana

References

External links
Indiana historical registers
Indiana Historic Sites and Structures Inventory

 
Historic Sites and Structures